The 2021–22 Texas Tech Red Raiders basketball team represents Texas Tech University in the 2021–22 NCAA Division I men's basketball season as a member of the Big 12 Conference. The Red Raiders were led by first-year coach Mark Adams. They played their home games at the United Supermarkets Arena in Lubbock, Texas. They finished the season 27–10, 12–6 in Big 12 play to finish in third place. In the Big 12 tournament, they defeated Iowa State and Oklahoma to advance to the championship game, but lost to Kansas. They received an at-large bid to the NCAA tournament as the No. 3 seed in the West region. There they defeated Montana State and Notre Dame to advance to the Sweet Sixteen. In the Sweet Sixteen, they lost to Duke.

Previous season
In a season limited due to the ongoing COVID-19 pandemic, the Red Raiders finished the season 18–11, 9–8 in Big 12 play to finish in tie for sixth place. They lost in the quarterfinals to Texas of the Big 12 tournament. They received an at-large bid to the NCAA tournament where they defeated Utah State in the first round before losing Arkansas in the second round.

On April 1, 2021, head coach Chris Beard left the school after five seasons to accept the head coaching job at Texas. The Red Raiders named top assistant Mark Adams as head coach on April 5.

Offseason

Departures

Incoming transfers

Recruiting classes

2021 recruiting class
There were no incoming recruits for the class of 2021.

2022 recruiting class

Roster

Schedule and results

|-
!colspan=12 style=|Regular season

|-
!colspan=9 style=|Big 12 Tournament

|-
!colspan=9 style=|NCAA tournament

Source

Rankings

*AP does not release post-NCAA tournament rankings.
No Coaches Poll for Week 1.

References

Texas Tech Red Raiders basketball seasons
Texas Tech
Texas Tech
Texas Tech
Texas Tech